{{Speciesbox
| image = Prunus_pseudocerasus_20070226-1607-100.jpg
| image_caption = Chinese sour cherry in bloom
| genus = Prunus
| display_parents = 2
| parent = Prunus sect. Cerasus
| species = pseudocerasus
| authority = Lindl.
| synonyms =  
Cerasus pseudocerasus (Lindl.) Loudon
Padus pseudocerasus (Lindl.) S.Ya.Sokolov
Prunus ampla Koehne
Prunus involucrata KoehnePrunus pauciflora Bunge
Prunus saltuum KoehnePrunus scopulorum Koehne
Cerasus scopulorum (Koehne) T.T.Yu & C.L.LiPrunus cantabrigiensis Stapf
Cerasus cantabrigiensis (Stapf) Ohle
}}Prunus pseudocerasus or Prunus pseudo-cerasus, the Chinese sour cherry or just Chinese cherry,  is a species of cherry native to China and is used worldwide as an ornamental for its early spring cherry blossoms. The fruits of some cultivars are edible.

Description

A small bushy tree growing to at most 8m, it generally has reddish buds, pale pink 2cm flowers and typical red (if a bit pale) 1.5cm cherries. It can be distinguished from its congeners by certain traits; its 7-16cm leaves are broadly obovate, with an acuminate tip, flat and serrated, its inflorescences are corymbose or subumbellate, with at least three and as many as seven flowers, and its branches and peduncles are pubescent.

Uses
In China it has been cultivated for its edible (if tart) fruit for around 2000 years. In Japan it is favored as an ornamental tree for its tendency to bloom, flowers before leaves, earlier than the Japanese cherry Prunus serrulata. A tetraploid with 2n=32 chromosomes, it is used as rootstock for other flowering cherries. It is the parent of a number of hybrid cultivars. It is resistant to the fungal disease cherry leaf spot. P. pseudocerasus contain carotene, vitamin C, proteins, saccharides, iron, and phosphorus. P. pseudocerasus'' is near extinction in the wild due to anthropogenic activities.

References

External links
 

pseudocerasus
Cherry blossom
Cherries
Sour fruits
Trees of Japan
Trees of China
Flora of Asia
Flora of Japan
Garden plants of Asia
Ornamental trees
Plants described in 1826